Wadi Halfa Airport  is an airport serving Wadi Halfa in Sudan.

History
In 1925 Alan Cobham made a first survey flight for Imperial Airways (a forerunner of British Airways) from UK to Cape Town, South Africa, stopping at Wadi Halfa on the way.

In 1937 a Savoia-Marchetti S.73 flown by Ala Littoria was flying from Asmara, Eritrea to Wadi Halfa and crashed while approaching the runway at 5:30 a.m. killing all three crew and six passengers.  That same year, Imperial Airways commenced a flying boat service between Southampton, UK and Durban, South Africa stopping at Wadi Halfa on the way.

In 1943 BOAC (a forerunner of British Airways) started a weekly flight between Cairo, Wadi Halfa and Khartoum with Lockheed 18 Lodestars.

In 1952, Airwork and Hunting-Clan (the forerunners of British Caledonian Airways ) started operating a regular air service called Safari between London, UK and Entebbe, Uganda stopping at Wadi Halfa airport en route. They were still running the service in 1959.

In 1956, Ethiopian Airlines were operating a service between Addis Ababa and Athens, Greece with a fuel stop at Wadi Halfa Airport.

In 1962 a Vickers 739 Viscount operated by United Arab Airlines flying from Jerusalem to Cairo, Egypt was diverted to Wadi Halfa airport because of bad weather at Cairo.  The plane ran out of fuel and crashed 5 kilometres (3 miles) West of Wadi Halfa airport but the 16 passengers and crew survived.

In 2012, the Sudanese government was reported to be planning to build a new airport at Wadi Halfa.

See also
Transport in Sudan
List of airports in Sudan

References

External links 
OurAirports - Wadi Halfa
SkyVector - Wadi Halfa
 Wadi Halfa Airport

Airports in Sudan